Viral evolution is a subfield of evolutionary biology and virology that is specifically concerned with the evolution of viruses. Viruses have short generation times, and many—in particular RNA viruses—have relatively high mutation rates (on the order of one point mutation or more per genome per round of replication). Although most viral mutations confer no benefit and often even prove deleterious to viruses, the rapid rate of viral mutation combined with natural selection allows viruses to quickly adapt to changes in their host environment. In addition, because viruses typically produce many copies in an infected host, mutated genes can be passed on to many offspring quickly. Although the chance of mutations and evolution can change depending on the type of virus (e.g., double stranded DNA, double stranded RNA, single strand DNA), viruses overall have high chances for mutations.

Viral evolution is an important aspect of the epidemiology of viral diseases such as influenza (influenza virus), AIDS (HIV), and hepatitis (e.g. HCV). The rapidity of viral mutation also causes problems in the development of successful vaccines and antiviral drugs, as resistant mutations often appear within weeks or months after the beginning of a treatment. One of the main theoretical models applied to viral evolution is the quasispecies model, which defines a viral quasispecies as a group of closely related viral strains competing within an environment.

Origins

Three classical hypotheses 
Viruses are ancient. Studies at the molecular level have revealed relationships between viruses infecting organisms from each of the three domains of life, suggesting viral proteins that pre-date the divergence of life and thus infecting the last universal common ancestor. This indicates that some viruses emerged early in the evolution of life, and that they have probably arisen multiple times. It has been suggested that new groups of viruses have repeatedly emerged at all stages of evolution, often through the displacement of ancestral structural and genome replication genes.
 
There are three classical hypotheses on the origins of viruses and how they evolved: 
 Virus-first hypothesis: Viruses evolved from complex molecules of protein and nucleic acid before cells first appeared on earth. By this hypothesis, viruses contributed to the rise of cellular life. This is supported by the idea that all viral genomes encode proteins that do not have cellular homologs. The virus-first hypothesis has been dismissed by some scientists because it violates the definition of viruses, in that they require a host cell to replicate.
 Reduction hypothesis (degeneracy hypothesis): Viruses were once small cells that parasitized larger cells. This is supported by the discovery of giant viruses with similar genetic material to parasitic bacteria. However, the hypothesis does not explain why even the smallest of cellular parasites do not resemble viruses in any way.
 Escape hypothesis (vagrancy hypothesis): Some viruses evolved from bits of DNA or RNA that "escaped" from the genes of larger organisms. This does not explain the structures that are unique to viruses and are not seen anywhere in cells. It also does not explain the complex capsids and other structures of virus particles.

Virologists are in the process of re-evaluating these hypotheses.

Later hypotheses  
Coevolution hypothesis (Bubble Theory): At the beginning of life, a community of early replicons (pieces of genetic information capable of self-replication) existed in proximity to a food source such as a hot spring or hydrothermal vent. This food source also produced lipid-like molecules self-assembling into vesicles that could enclose replicons. Close to the food source replicons thrived, but further away the only non-diluted resources would be inside vesicles. Therefore, evolutionary pressure could push replicons along two paths of development: merging with a vesicle, giving rise to cells; and entering the vesicle, using its resources, multiplying and leaving for another vesicle, giving rise to viruses.
 Chimeric-origins hypothesis: Based on the analyses of the evolution of the replicative and structural modules of viruses, a chimeric scenario for the origin of viruses was proposed in 2019. According to this hypothesis, the replication modules of viruses originated from the primordial genetic pool, although the long course of their subsequent evolution involved many displacements by replicative genes from their cellular hosts. By contrast, the genes encoding major structural proteins evolved from functionally diverse host proteins throughout the evolution of the virosphere. This scenario is distinct from each of the three traditional scenarios but combines features of the Virus-first and Escape hypotheses.

One of the problems for studying viral origins and evolution is the high rate of viral mutation, particularly the case in RNA retroviruses like HIV/AIDS.  A recent study based on comparisons of viral protein folding structures, however, is offering some new evidence.  Fold Super Families (FSFs) are proteins that show similar folding structures independent of the actual sequence of amino acids, and have been found to show evidence of viral phylogeny. The proteome of a virus, the viral proteome, still contains traces of ancient evolutionary history that can be studied today.  The study of protein FSFs suggests the existence of ancient cellular lineages common to both cells and viruses before the appearance of the 'last universal cellular ancestor' that gave rise to modern cells. Evolutionary pressure to reduce genome and particle size may have eventually reduced viro-cells into modern viruses, whereas other coexisting cellular lineages eventually evolved into modern cells.  Furthermore, the long genetic distance between RNA and DNA FSFs suggests that the RNA world hypothesis may have new experimental evidence, with a long intermediary period in the evolution of cellular life.

Definitive exclusion of a hypothesis on the origin of viruses is difficult to make on Earth given the ubiquitous interactions between viruses and cells, and the lack of availability of rocks that are old enough to reveal traces of the earliest viruses on the planet. From an astrobiological perspective, it has therefore been proposed that on celestial bodies such as Mars not only cells but also traces of former virions or viroids should be actively searched for: possible findings of traces of virions in the apparent absence of cells could provide support for the virus-first hypothesis.

Evolution

Viruses do not form fossils in the traditional sense, because they are much smaller than the finest colloidal fragments forming sedimentary rocks that fossilize plants and animals. However, the genomes of many organisms contain endogenous viral elements (EVEs). These DNA sequences are the remnants of ancient virus genes and genomes that ancestrally 'invaded' the host germline. For example, the genomes of most vertebrate species contain hundreds to thousands of sequences derived from ancient retroviruses.  These sequences are a valuable source of retrospective evidence about the evolutionary history of viruses, and have given birth to the science of paleovirology.

The evolutionary history of viruses can to some extent be inferred from analysis of contemporary viral genomes. The mutation rates for many viruses have been measured, and application of a molecular clock allows dates of divergence to be inferred.

Viruses evolve through changes in their RNA (or DNA), some quite rapidly, and the best adapted mutants quickly outnumber their less fit counterparts. In this sense their evolution is Darwinian. The way viruses reproduce in their host cells makes them particularly susceptible to the genetic changes that help to drive their evolution.  The RNA viruses are especially prone to mutations. In host cells there are mechanisms for correcting mistakes when DNA replicates and these kick in whenever cells divide. These important mechanisms prevent potentially lethal mutations from being passed on to offspring. But these mechanisms do not work for RNA and when an RNA virus replicates in its host cell, changes in their genes are occasionally introduced in error, some of which are lethal. One virus particle can produce millions of progeny viruses in just one cycle of replication, therefore the production of a few "dud" viruses is not a problem. Most mutations are "silent" and do not result in any obvious changes to the progeny viruses, but others confer advantages that increase the fitness of the viruses in the environment. These could be changes to the virus particles that disguise them so they are not identified by the cells of the immune system or changes that make antiviral drugs less effective. Both of these changes occur frequently with HIV.

Many viruses (for example, influenza A virus) can "shuffle" their genes with other viruses when two similar strains infect the same cell. This phenomenon is called genetic shift, and is often the cause of new and more virulent strains appearing. Other viruses change more slowly as mutations in their genes gradually accumulate over time, a process known as antigenic drift.

Through these mechanisms new viruses are constantly emerging and present a continuing challenge in attempts to control the diseases they cause. Most species of viruses are now known to have common ancestors, and although the "virus first" hypothesis has yet to gain full acceptance, there is little doubt that the thousands of species of modern viruses have evolved from less numerous ancient ones. The morbilliviruses, for example, are a group of closely related, but distinct viruses that infect a broad range of animals. The group includes measles virus, which infects humans and primates; canine distemper virus, which infects many animals including dogs, cats, bears, weasels and hyaenas; rinderpest, which infected cattle and buffalo; and other viruses of seals, porpoises and dolphins. Although it is not possible to prove which of these rapidly evolving viruses is the earliest, for such a closely related group of viruses to be found in such diverse hosts suggests the possibility that their common ancestor is ancient.

Bacteriophage
Escherichia virus T4 (phage T4) is a species of bacteriophage that infects Escherichia coli bacteria. It is a double-stranded DNA virus in the family Myoviridae.  Phage T4 is an obligate intracellular parasite that reproduces within the host bacterial cell and its progeny are released when the host is destroyed by lysis. The complete genome sequence of phage T4 encodes about 300 gene products.  These virulent viruses are among the largest, most complex viruses that are known and one of the best studied model organisms. They have played a key role in the development of virology and molecular biology.  The numbers of reported genetic homologies between phage T4 and bacteria and between phage T4 and eukaryotes are similar suggesting that phage T4 shares ancestry with both bacteria and eukaryotes and has about equal similarity to each.   Phage T4 may have diverged in evolution from a common ancestor of bacteria and eukaryotes or from an early evolved member of either lineage. Most of the phage genes showing homology with bacteria and eukaryotes encode enzymes acting in the ubiquitous processes of DNA replication, DNA repair, recombination and nucleotide synthesis.  These processes likely evolved very early.  The adaptive features of the enzymes catalyzing these early processes may have been maintained in the phage T4, bacterial, and eukaryotic lineages because they were established well-tested solutions to basic functional problems by the time these lineages diverged.

Transmission 
Viruses have been able to continue their infectious existence due to evolution. Their rapid mutation rates and natural selection has given viruses the advantage to continue to spread. One way that viruses have been able to spread is with the evolution of virus transmission. The virus can find a new host through:

 Droplet transmission- passed on through body fluids (sneezing on someone)
 An example is the influenza virus  
 Airborne transmission- passed on through the air (brought in by breathing)
 An example would be how viral meningitis is passed on 
 Vector transmission- picked up by a carrier and brought to a new host
 An example is viral encephalitis
 Waterborne transmission- leaving a host, infecting the water, and being consumed in a new host
 Poliovirus is an example for this
 Sit-and-wait-transmission- the virus is living outside a host for long periods of time
 The smallpox virus is also an example for this

Virulence, or the harm that the virus does on its host, depends on various factors. In particular, the method of transmission tends to affect how the level of virulence will change over time. Viruses that transmit through vertical transmission (transmission to the offspring of the host) will evolve to have lower levels of virulence. Viruses that transmit through horizontal transmission (transmission between members of the same species that don't have a parent-child relationship) will usually evolve to have a higher virulence.

See also

 DNA virus
 Earliest known life forms
 Evolution of the Sacbrood Virus
 RNA virus
 Viral classification
 Viral decay acceleration
 Viral phylodynamics
 Viral quasispecies
 Endothelial Cell Tropism

References

Bibliography

External links
 

Evolutionary biology
Virology
Microbial population biology